Darlene Anya (Darlen Anya, Rosalie Darlene Anaya) is a former judoka for the United States.  She was born on  20-Aug-1961.  She competed in the 1984 World Judo Championships and would go on to win the silver medal in the under 48 kg division.  She was elected the United States Judo Association Hall of Fame as an outstanding female competitor.   She is a second generation judoka having been trained by her father Levi A. Anaya.  She would go on to a career in law enforcement in her native Albuquerque, where she would be the first woman shot in the line of duty.  She would receive the Purple Heart and would later retire.

References

American female judoka
Living people
1961 births
Pan American Games medalists in judo
Pan American Games gold medalists for the United States
Pan American Games bronze medalists for the United States
Judoka at the 1983 Pan American Games
Judoka at the 1987 Pan American Games
Medalists at the 1983 Pan American Games
Medalists at the 1987 Pan American Games
20th-century American women